IRAS 13224-3809 is a highly active and fluctuating Seyfert 1  galaxy in the constellation Centaurus about 1 billion light-years from Earth. The galaxy is notable due to its centrally-located supermassive black hole that is closely studied by astronomers using x-ray astronomy, particularly X-ray reverberation echo mapping techniques, in an effort to better understand the inner workings, including mass and spin, of black holes.

References

External links
SIMBAD
 SIMBAD/ascii
 
 

Centaurus (constellation)
Seyfert galaxies
TIC objects